This article presents a list of the historical events and publications of Australian literature during 1862.

Poetry 

 Charles Harpur
 "The Hunter's Indian Dove"
 "Life and Death"
 A Poet's Home
 Henry Kendall
 "After the Hunt"
 "Caroline Chisholm"
 Poems and Songs

Births 

A list, ordered by date of birth (and, if the date is either unspecified or repeated, ordered alphabetically by surname) of births in 1862 of Australian literary figures, authors of written works or literature-related individuals follows, including year of death.

 28 September – W. T. Goodge, poet and writer (died 1909)

See also 
 1862 in Australia
 1862 in literature
 1862 in poetry
 List of years in Australian literature
List of years in literature

References

 
Australia
19th-century Australian literature
Australian literature by year